The Nigerian Postal Service, abbreviated as NIPOST is a government-owned and operated corporation, is the Nigerian postal administration responsible for providing postal services in Nigeria. It has more than 12,000 employees and runs more than 3,000 post offices.  The Nigerian Postal Service also have the following Commercial Business Units; EMS/PARCEL, e-Commerce & Logistics, Financial Services, Mails, Counters, Property & Workshop, NIPOST Training School.

Nigeria is a member of the Universal postal Union,  West African Postal Conference.

See also

Postage stamps and postal history of Nigeria
Postal orders of Nigeria
Postal codes in Nigeria
List of villages in Nigeria

Notes

External links
 
 NIPOST Carrier Portal

Postal organizations
Postal system of Nigeria
Philately of Nigeria
1987 establishments in Nigeria